Tetragonoderus is a genus of beetles in the family Carabidae, containing the following species:

 Tetragonoderus aegypticus Jedlicka, 1952 
 Tetragonoderus aericollis Quedenfeldt, 1883 
 Tetragonoderus andrewesi Emden, 1934 
 Tetragonoderus arcuatus Dejean, 1829 
 Tetragonoderus assamensis Jedlicka, 1964  
 Tetragonoderus assuanensis Mjuberg, 1905 
 Tetragonoderus babaulti Alluaud, 1931 
 Tetragonoderus bastardi Alluaud, 1897 
 Tetragonoderus bayeri Burgeon, 1936  
 Tetragonoderus bilunatus Klug, 1833 
 Tetragonoderus bivittatus Jeannel, 1949 
 Tetragonoderus chalceus Chaudoir, 1876 
 Tetragonoderus chaudoiri Liebke, 1928 
 Tetragonoderus chilensis (Dejean, 1831) 
 Tetragonoderus cinchona Jedlicka, 1964 
 Tetragonoderus columbicus Steinheil, 1875 
 Tetragonoderus crux Dejean, 1829 
 Tetragonoderus cursor Bates, 1886 
 Tetragonoderus deuvei Shpeley & Ball, 2008
 Tetragonoderus dilatatus (Wiedemann, 1823) 
 Tetragonoderus discopunctatus Chaudoir, 1850 
 Tetragonoderus dispar Peringuey, 1892 
 Tetragonoderus dissimilis (Basilewsky, 1955) 
 Tetragonoderus elegans Andrewes, 1931 
 Tetragonoderus eximius Kirsch, 1873 
 Tetragonoderus extremus Bedel, 1905 
 Tetragonoderus fasciatus (Haldeman, 1843) 
 Tetragonoderus femoralis (Chaudoir, 1876) 
 Tetragonoderus figuratus Dejean, 1831 
 Tetragonoderus fimbriatus Bates, 1886 
 Tetragonoderus flavovittatus C.O.Waterhouse, 1881 
 Tetragonoderus foveicollis Liebke, 1951 
 Tetragonoderus gabonicus Chaudoir, 1876 
 Tetragonoderus immaculatus Laferte-Senectere, 1853 
 Tetragonoderus inermis (Jeannel, 1949) 
 Tetragonoderus insignicollis Chaudoir, 1878 
 Tetragonoderus insularius Andrewes, 1931 
 Tetragonoderus intermedius Solsky, 1874 
 Tetragonoderus intermixtus Bates, 1883 
 Tetragonoderus interruptus Dejean, 1829 
 Tetragonoderus intersectus (Germar, 1824))
 Tetragonoderus jeanneli Alluaud, 1931 
 Tetragonoderus kaszabi (Basilewsky, 1987) 
 Tetragonoderus kuntzeni Burgeon, 1936 
 Tetragonoderus lacordairei Chaudoir, 1876 
 Tetragonoderus laevigatus Chaudoir, 1876 
 Tetragonoderus latipennis Leconte, 1874 
 Tetragonoderus leleupi (Basilewsky, 1956) 
 Tetragonoderus leprieurii Gory, 1833 
 Tetragonoderus lindemannae Jedlicka, 1963  
 Tetragonoderus lindneri Emden, 1935 
 Tetragonoderus linealis Andrewes, 1938 
 Tetragonoderus lozai Allen, 1973 
 Tetragonoderus luridus Quedenfeldt, 1883 
 Tetragonoderus matilei Ball, 2000 
 Tetragonoderus mexicanus (Chaudoir, 1876)  
 Tetragonoderus microthorax Jian & Tian, 2009
 Tetragonoderus mixtus Chaudoir, 1876 
 Tetragonoderus multiguttatus Putzeys, 1846 
 Tetragonoderus nagatomii Jedlicka, 1966 
 Tetragonoderus nakaoi Jedlicka, 1966 
 Tetragonoderus notaphioides Motschulsky, 1861 
 Tetragonoderus obscurus Chaudoir, 1876 
 Tetragonoderus omophronides (Chaudoir, 1876) 
 Tetragonoderus oxyomus (Chaudoir, 1876) 
 Tetragonoderus pallidus G.Horn, 1868 
 Tetragonoderus perrieri Fairmaire, 1900  
 Tetragonoderus pictus (Perty, 1830) 
 Tetragonoderus poecilus Bates, 1883 
 Tetragonoderus punctatus (Wiedemann, 1823) 
 Tetragonoderus quadriguttatus Dejean, 1829 
 Tetragonoderus quadrimaculatus Gory, 1833 
 Tetragonoderus quadrinotatus (Fabricius, 1798) 
 Tetragonoderus quadrisignatus (Quensel In Schonherr, 1806) 
 Tetragonoderus quadrum (Fabricius, 1792) 
 Tetragonoderus rhombophorus Schmidt-Goebel, 1846 
 Tetragonoderus rivularis Erichson, 1847 
 Tetragonoderus sericatus Dejean, 1829 
 Tetragonoderus simplex Bates, 1883 
 Tetragonoderus sinuosus Chaudoir, 1876 
 Tetragonoderus sivianus Liebke, 1951 
 Tetragonoderus spinifer (Jeannel, 1949) 
 Tetragonoderus stephaniae G.Muller, 1942 
 Tetragonoderus sticticus Erichson, 1847 
 Tetragonoderus subfasciatus (Putzeys, 1846) 
 Tetragonoderus swahilius Alluaud, 1931 
 Tetragonoderus taeniatus (Wiedemann, 1823) 
 Tetragonoderus tesselatus Chaudoir, 1876 
 Tetragonoderus tetragrammus Chaudoir, 1876  
 Tetragonoderus thunbergi Crotch, 1870 
 Tetragonoderus toamasinae Alluaud, 1896 
 Tetragonoderus undatus Dejean, 1829 
 Tetragonoderus unicolor Gemminger & Harold, 1868 
 Tetragonoderus variegatus Dejean, 1829 
 Tetragonoderus variipennis (Chaudoir, 1876) 
 Tetragonoderus velutinus Motschulsky, 1864 
 Tetragonoderus viridicollis Dejean, 1829
 Tetragonoderus viridis (Dejean, 1831)

References

 
Lebiinae